Gerkhmakhi (Dargwa: Хӏерхмахьи) is a rural locality (a selo) in Akushinsky District, Republic of Dagestan, Russia. The population was 2,087 as of 2010. There are 6 streets.

Geography
Gerkhmakhi is located 23 km east of Akusha (the district's administrative centre) by road. Verkhniye Mulebki is the nearest rural locality.

References 

Rural localities in Akushinsky District